The Zeiss Loxia Distagon T* 2/21mm is a full-frame (FE) wide-angle manual focus prime lens for the Sony E-mount, announced by Zeiss on October 12, 2015.

Though designed for Sony's full frame E-mount cameras, the lens can be used on Sony's APS-C E-mount camera bodies, with an equivalent full-frame field-of-view of 31.5mm.

Build quality
The lens features a minimalist weather resistant metal construction with a matte black finish and an aperture de-click screw found at the bottom of the lens.

Image Quality
The lens is exceptionally sharp from its maximum aperture of f/2.8 across the frame. Distortion and chromatic aberration are all well controlled. However, the lens suffers from moderate vignetting.

The lens also excels at low-light photography given its fast maximum aperture of f/2.8 and exceptional coma control. In addition, having a wide-angle field-of view allows for longer exposures to be taken of stars without the effect of star trails affecting the resultant image.

See also
 List of third-party E-mount lenses
 Tokina FiRIN 20mm F2

References

Camera lenses introduced in 2015
Loxia 2.8 21